Churahi is a Western Pahari language of Himachal Pradesh, India. It is spoken in the Chaurah and Saluni tehsils of Chamba district, and is considered vulnerable.

Adages

Script 
The native script of the language is Takri script.

Status 
The language is commonly called Pahari or Himachali. Some speaker may even call it a dialect of Dogri. The language has no official status. According to the United Nations Education, Scientific and Cultural Organisation (UNESCO), the language is of definitely endangered category, i.e. many Churahi children are not learning Churahi as their mother tongue any longer.

The demand for the inclusion of 'Pahari (Himachali)' under the Eight Schedule of the Constitution, which is supposed to represent multiple Pahari languages of Himachal Pradesh, had been made in the year 2010 by the state's Vidhan Sabha. There has been no positive progress on this matter since then even when small organisations are striving to save the language. Due to political interest, the language is currently recorded as a dialect of Hindi, even when having a poor mutual intelligibility with it and having a higher mutual intelligibility with other recognised languages like Dogri and other Western Pahari languages.

References 

Northern Indo-Aryan languages
Languages of Himachal Pradesh
Endangered languages of India